Lesbian, gay, bisexual, and transgender (LGBT) persons in  Maldives face legal challenges not experienced by non-LGBT residents.

The Maldives law criminalises homosexuality and prescribes criminal penalties for same-sex sexual conduct and relationships. The Penal Code of the Maldives works with Islamic Shariah Law to punish any acts relating to homosexuality through prison sentences, fines, and lashings. Despite this, homosexuality is rarely prosecuted, but remains a social taboo where sexual orientation discrimination occurs frequently and those in the LGBT community are subject to hate crimes and other human rights violations.

LGBTQ tourists are considered to be "welcome" at most tourist islands, but tourist guides caution that many of the islands that are not open to tourists may be subject to Shariah Law.

Maldivian culture

Dhivehi language

The Dhivehi word for homosexuality is "".

Legality of same-sex sexual acts

Penal Code and Islamic Law

The Penal Code of the Maldives further criminalises homosexuality in several ways. Criminal sexual contact is defined under section 131 of the Maldives Penal Code and refers to the prohibition of sexual contact without any reason permitted under Islamic Law. Same-sex intercourse is illegal under Islamic Law. Same-sex sexual intercourse is explicitly named as an offense within section 411(2) of the Penal Code and is defined under section 411(f).

Punishment and enforcement mechanisms
According to the International Lesbian, Gay, Bisexual, Trans and Intersex Association (ILGA) the Maldives Penal Code, prior to amendment in 2015, left matters concerning sexual conduct uncodified and to be regulated by Islamic Law, applicable to Muslims only. However, since the amended Penal Code came into effect the laws concerning LGBT rights have tightened.

Maximum penalties for homosexual acts prohibited under the Maldives Penal Code include; imprisonment of up to one year for unlawful marriage under s410(a)(8), imprisonment of up to eight years for criminal conduct under s411(a)(2) and 411(d) with allowance for a supplementary 100 lashes punishment under Islamic Sharia Law, and imprisonment for up to four years for unlawful sexual conduct under s412.

Homosexual acts cannot be punished with death under Maldivian law. Capital punishment, under both civil code and Sharia law has been in abeyance since 1953. During preparations to recommence executions in 2015, new regulations were passed on the implementation of the penalty: Section 92 (k) of the amended Maldivian Penal Code explicates that the death penalty was only to be available for egregious purposeful killing. Some point to section 1205 which states that "if an offender is found guilty of committing an offence for which punishments are predetermined in the Holy Quran, that person shall be punished according to Islamic law and as prescribed by this Act and the Holy Quran". The Quran does not specify a punishment for homosexuality. Accordingly, the punishment under Maldivian law are those specified in Sections 410 to 412. The plans to reimplement the death penalty were later abandoned and the moratorium on capital punishment—for any crime—continued.

Recognition of same-sex relationships

Same-sex relationships, including same-sex marriages, civil unions, and domestic partnerships, are not recognised in the Maldives.

Section 410(a)(8) of the Maldives Penal Code (In force since 16 July 2015) criminalises same-sex marriage by stating that it is an offence if "two persons of the same sex enter into a marriage".

Discrimination protections 
There is no legal protection against discrimination based on sexual orientation or gender identity.

Constitutional framework

In 2009, the Maldives enacted a new Constitution that included a chapter on rights and freedoms, demonstrating the desire to embrace a new culture of human rights. However, this did not include any resolutions regarding LGBT human rights issues.

United Nations developments

United Nations resolutions

In 2008, a European-drafted statement called for the decriminalisation of homosexuality and recommended that states "take all the necessary measures, in particular legislative or administrative, to ensure that sexual orientation or gender identity may under no circumstances be the basis for criminal penalties, in particular executions, arrests or detention". The Maldives was one of the initial 57 members (now 54 members) which signed an opposing document, read by the Syrian representative, that divided the United Nations General Assembly on the issue of LGBT Rights.

As a country under Islamic Sharia Law, the Maldives followed the documents beliefs on several matters. The document stated that the European-drafted statement interfered with matters that should be within the domestic jurisdiction of individual states. Furthermore, the document also stated a desire to avoid the social normalisation of what were considered to be 'disgraceful acts' by setting new rights and standards that were not agreed upon by entering into membership and following the Universal Declaration of Human Rights. It also claimed that the declaration was a threat to the international framework of human rights.

In June 2011, the Maldives rejected a resolution submitted by the Republic of South Africa at the United Nations which sought to affirm the rights of the LGBT community. A second resolution was adopted by the United Nations Human Rights Council in September 2014 which related to sexual orientation and gender identity, however, this was again rejected by the Maldives.

Universal Periodic Review

In September 2014, in the Human Rights Commission of the Maldives (HRCM) submission to the Universal Periodic Review of the Maldives, a number of human rights issues were highlighted; however, no LGBT rights issues were discussed. 'Freedom of Expression' was highlighted as an area of concern where it was noted, "there are no laws which guarantee freedom of expression in the Maldives". Reference was made to the numerous death threats and other violent behaviour received by human rights activists and the Commission did note the need to "take measures to address issues of threats and intimidation directed to parliamentarians, journalists and civil society activists to ensure their safety".

This may or may not extend to the same persecution suffered by LGBT rights activists. The objectives of the Maldives Human Rights Commission are set out in the Human Rights Commission Act and explain why LGBT Rights were not included in the submission. The objectives of the Commission include protecting, promoting and sustaining human rights in the Maldives "in accordance with Islamic Sharia and the Constitution of the Maldives".

In the United Nation's 2016 report of the Human Rights Council on its thirtieth session, it was noted that the Maldives accepted 198 recommendations made out of 258, leaving 60 recommendations rejected. These 60 recommendations included matters that were said to contradict the Islamic Faith and the Constitution of the Maldives; such as those "relating to freedom of religion, lesbian, gay, bisexual and transgender and non-traditional forms of the family". Here, Action Canada for Population and Development responded by noting their concern over the Maldives rejection of "adopting a law against discrimination on the basis of sexual orientation".

The Human Rights Council, in 2015, recommended that the Maldives accelerate their work towards enacting anti-discrimination legislation and to "ensure it includes a prohibition of discrimination on the basis of sexual orientation; and combat the stigmatization and marginalization of homosexuals in society" It was reported that those perceived as homosexual or transgender in the Maldives were the target of hate crimes and other human rights violations and so the United Nations Population Fund (UNFPA) recommended the Maldives seek to ensure the protection of LGBT individuals from this through law reform. The Committee also recommended that the Maldives "decriminalize sexual relations between consenting adults of the same sex". These recommendations were noted by the Maldives but not accepted.

In the Human Rights Council's National Report for the Maldives in 2015, it was noted that since the review of the Maldives in 2010 there have been many important developments in terms of human rights as the country transitioned to a democratic society. The report does not, however, include any detailing of LGBT human rights issues or developments.

In May 2015, in a briefing paper submitted to the Maldives second cycle Universal Periodic Review, the International Service for Human Rights (ISHR) said "[u]ncodified Muslim Sharia Law criminalises homosexual conduct, thus making the Maldives a very insecure place to advocate for the rights of persons who identify themselves as LGBT".

Living conditions

Persecution

In 2013, a blogger named Hilath Rasheed was nearly killed in a violent attack outside his home in the Maldives due to his open homosexuality. and push for religious freedom. Freedom of religion, which heavily interweaves with freedom of expression and sexuality in the Maldives, remains heavily restricted in the country, both legally and through public opinion. A 2014 article in New Zealand spoke of Abraham Naim who was granted asylum due to the persecution he faced being gay in the Maldives.

The Ministry of Business, Innovation and Employment was said to have granted refugee status because Naim was "at risk of serious harm from state agents" and would likely face further persecution for being openly gay on returning to the Maldives. This was affirmed by Ibrahim Muaz, a spokesman at the President's Office, who commented that those seeking asylum abroad for reasons of sexual orientation discrimination would face prosecution upon return. While discrimination is apparent in the Maldives it remains a popular holiday destination for LGBT couples who rarely experience the reality of the country's Islamic based law due to the income from tourism.

Rainbow Warriors stated that the local Maldives LGBT movement is mostly limited to the virtual world, operating on the internet, due to the uncertainty and the intensity of homophobia in the country. 2015 saw two local men arrested in their private home on one of the islands in the Maldives with charges of homosexuality following a complaint by a member of the public.

Summary table

See also

 Human rights in the Maldives
 LGBT rights in Asia
 LGBT in Islam
 Capital punishment for homosexuality
 Criminalisation of homosexuality

Notes

References

Further reading

Human rights in the Maldives
Maldives
LGBT in the Maldives
Law of the Maldives